Seth Ryan (born March 26, 1994) is a former American football player for the Clemson Tigers and assistant wide receivers coach for the Detroit Lions of the National Football League (NFL). He is best known as being the son of former New York Jets and Buffalo Bills head coach Rex Ryan.

Playing career 
Ryan played wide receiver for the Clemson Tigers.  Ryan graduated from Summit High School in Summit, New Jersey and was redshirted as a freshman with the Tigers in 2013. On January 9, 2017, Ryan was part of the Clemson team that defeated Alabama in the 2017 College Football Playoff National Championship by a score of 35–31.

Coaching career
In 2019 Seth was hired by the Los Angeles Chargers of the NFL to be a quality control coach as a part of Anthony Lynn’s staff.
In 2021 he went with Lynn to the Detroit Lions where he was named the team’s assistant wide receivers coach. 

In 2022, despite Lynn being fired as offensive coordinator at the end of the 2021 NFL season, Ryan stayed with the Lions and was announced as assistant wide receivers coach.

References

1994 births
Living people
American football wide receivers
Clemson Tigers football players
Los Angeles Chargers coaches
Players of American football from New Jersey
People from Phoenix, Arizona
Sportspeople from Summit, New Jersey
Summit High School (New Jersey) alumni
Detroit Lions coaches